The following is a list of proposed language families, which connect established families into larger genetic groups; support for these proposals varies; the Dené–Yeniseian languages for example, are a recent proposal which has been generally well received, whereas reconstructions of the Proto-World language are often viewed as fringe science; proposals which are themselves based on other proposals have the likelihood of their parts noted in parentheses.

Under considerations

Austronesian-related languages

Indo-European related languages

Native American related languages

Trans Eurasia-America languages

Widely rejected 
Below are language families that are already rejected by most linguists. Since it's widely rejected, only linguists who agreed will be shown.

See also 
List of language families

References